Areg or AREG may refer to:
Areg, Armenian male given name
Areg, Aragatsotn, village in Armenia
AREG or Amphiregulin, a protein